Changsha South railway station is a metro station and a railway station of Wuguang Passenger Railway and Hukun Passenger Railway. The station is located in Lituo Subdistrict, Yuhua District, Changsha, Hunan, China. It is a hub and the connecting point of Beijing–Guangzhou–Shenzhen–Hong Kong High-Speed Railway, Shanghai–Kunming High-Speed Railway and the proposed Xiamen-Changsha-Chongqing High-Speed Railway. The station was opened on 26 December 2009.

It is a transportation center of high-speed railways, metro lines 2 & 4, maglev, buses and coaches, which seamlessly connect downtown, Changsha Huanghua Airport and nearby cities.

Design
The designer of the station building is from the 3rd department of Central South Architectural Design Institute, INC. The roof features the waves and ripples of water. It has a total construction area of 273,000 square meters and the depot area is 137,000 square meters.

History
The station opened on 26 December 2009.

When the station was first open, the surrounded area—which is away from Changsha's city center—was mostly industrial. Since then, however, high-rise residential and office development has taken place around the station. The passenger volume has also increased greatly.

Gallery

Rail services

China Railway
The station is served by the Wuhan–Guangzhou and Shanghai–Kunming high-speed railways.

Changsha Metro

Line 2 and Line 4 of Changsha Metro connects Changsha South Railway Station with the city.
For Line 2, Changsha South Railway Station is the second station from the east (after Guangda).
All other stops are in the west and the terminal is Wangchengpo to which the ride takes about 40 minutes.

Layout

Changsha Maglev

The medium-low speed Changsha Maglev Express between Changsha South Railway Station and Changsha Huanghua International Airport started services on 6 May 2016. The Maglev line is 18.5 km long and trains run at a speed of 120 km/h to finish the journey in just over ten minutes.

Local transport

City Bus
Many buses serve Changsha South Railway Station:
 16, 124, 135, 159, 160, 348, 503, 63 (express), 66
The tickets for all buses cost about ￥2. Check the timetables and routes at the bus terminal.

Taxi
The distance to city center is approximately 10 kilometers and the charging standards are as following.
 05:00-21:00   Initial price: ￥6 for first 2 km, then ￥1.8/km and finally ￥2.7/km after 10 km
 21:00-05:00   Initial price: ￥7 for first 2 km, then ￥2.2/km and finally ￥2.7/km after 10 km

Airport Coach
The service is to Changsha Huanghua International Airport. It takes about half an hour.
 Line 3: South Bus Station via Changsha South Railway Station (Price: 21.5CNY single)

See also
 Changsha railway station
 Changsha Metro

References

External links

 Changsha Metro Group website

Railway stations in Hunan
Railway stations in China opened in 2009
Transport in Changsha
Stations on the Wuhan–Guangzhou High-Speed Railway